The Mozambique ridged frog (Ptychadena mossambica, also known as the broad-banded grass frog, Mozambique grass frog, Mozambique grassland frog, or single-striped grass frog) is a species of frog in the family Ptychadenidae. These frogs can swim fairly well, jump far and can crawl with ease through dense plants. Their strong hindlegs can launch them up to three metres into the air in a single bound.

Taxonomy
Named after Mozambique where the species was first identified.

Conservation status
Not threatened.

Description
Length: 45–50 mm, maximum 53 mm

Body
Internarial distance greater than snout-nostril distance.

Above
Dark grey-brown to chocolate brown or green. A broad creamy to orange-brown vertebral band from snout to vent, bordered by elongated blackish spots. Snout without prominent pale triangle, not paler than rest of body. 6 or more dorsolateral skin ridges prominent, continuous only as far as the hump of the back and creamy-white. Dark brown blotches, smaller than eye, between vertebral bands and dorsolateral ridges.

Tympanum
Prominent. Slightly smaller than eye.

Underside 
Creamy-white, sometimes with grey mottling along lower jaw on throat and on hind part of abdomen. Thighs and groin often pale yellow. Skin smooth.

Forelimbs
Arm comparatively short.

Hindlimbs
Foot shorter than tibia. There is a pale line sometimes present along the upper surface of the tibia. Back of thigh dark grey, with yellow mottling sometimes forming irregular lines. Webbing moderate. 2,75 to 3 phalanges of fourth toe and one phalanx of fifth toe free of webbing. Tarsal fold present. Inner and outer metatarsal tubercles present. Row of tubercles under fourth toe.

Sexual dimorphism
Gular slits in male not parallel to jaw-line on lateral view.

Key identification points
 Back of thighs with yellow mottling, sometimes forming irregular lines (distinct from P. subpunctata, P. taenioscelis and P. guibei).
 Internarial distance greater than snout-nostril distance (distinct from other species except P. guibei, P. mapacha and P. schillukorum).
 Length of foot less than tibia length (distinct from P. guibei, P. mascareniensis, P. subpunctata and P. taenioscelis).
 Pale line on tibia sometimes present (distinct from P. anchietae, P. oxyrhychus, P. schillukorum and P. taenioscelis, although sometimes present also in P. subpunctata).
 Outer metatarsal tubercle present (distinct from other species except P. guibei, P. mapacha and P. schillukorum).
 Broad pale band extends from rump to snout but snout not paler than the rest of the body (distinct from P. anchietae, P. oxyrhynchus, P. schillukorum and P. subpunctata).
 Mottling on the back of the thighs is irregular with no discernable pattern.

Similar species
This species is smaller than most other Ptychadena species. It is similar to the Sharp-nosed Grass Frog (P. oxyrhynchus). It is less conspicuous than the Plain Grass Frog (P. anchietae) and hides by day, calling from concealed positions. Previously considered a race of the Mascarene Grass Frog (Rana mascarenienis mossambica Loveridge); the length from the heel to the toes in P. mascareniensis is greater than the length of the tibia. The Dwarf Grass Frog (P. taenioscelis) is smaller (less than 35 mm), with stripes down the backside of the thighs.

Distribution
It is found in South Africa from northern Zululand through the Lowveld and Kruger National Park northwards to Botswana, Eswatini, Kenya, Malawi, Mozambique, Namibia, Tanzania, Zambia, Zimbabwe, and possibly Angola. Best viewing: Kruger-Lowveld (South Africa), Okavango (Botswana), Tshaneni (Eswatini).

Call
The call of these frog is a series of harsh nasal kwe-kwe or wah-wah-wah clucks, repeated at the rate of two per second, much like the quacking of the Egyptian Goose. Males call from concealed positions in grass tussocks at the edge of water on shores of marshes and pans or even several metres away from water. Until vegetation establishes itself after winter, males may call along the water's edge in completely exposed positions. Calling peakings after dark till about midnight.

Habitat
Its natural habitats is flooded grass and rush around intermittent (pans) and permanent freshwater marshes (vleis), ponds or streams in a variety of bushveld vegetation types at altitudes of 200 to 1 200 m in dry savanna, thicket and subtropical or tropical dry and seasonally wet or flooded lowland grassland, but also moist savanna, subtropical or tropical dry forest, subtropical or tropical dry and moist shrubland, swamps, intermittent freshwater lakes, arable land, pastureland and water storage areas.

Habits
When the pools in its preferred habitats dry up, the frogs often seek refuge in deep cracks and crevices in the underlying mud that is busy drying. Here they often spend the dry winter months, and become active after the first spring rains. When disturbed, it jumps away from the water to vegetation, crawls beneath it and is concealed.

Reproduction
In the Kruger National Park 315 eggs were collected from a single female. Each egg is 1,2 mm in diameter and surrounded by a transparent jelly about 3 mm in diameter. The eggs sink to the bottom. The animal pole of the egg is a dark grey-brown while the vegetable pole is a creamy yellow-white. The eggs develop very quickly.

Tadpole
Unknown.

References

 BUTCHART, D. 2000. Wildlife of the Okavango. Common animals and plants. Struik Publishers, Cape Town. 126pp. 
 CARRUTHERS, V. 1998. Paddas. In V. Carruthers (redakteur) Die natuurlewe van suider-Afrika. ‘n Veldgids tot die diere en plante van die streek. Southern Boekuitgewers, Halfweghuis: 74-83. 
 CARRUTHERS, V. 2001. Frogs and frogging in southern Africa. Struik Publishers, Cape Town. 100pp. 
 DU PREEZ, L. & CARRUTHERS, V. 2009. A complete guide to the frogs of southern Africa. Struik Nature, Cape Town. 488pp. 
 PIENAAR, U. de V., PASSMORE, N.I. & CARRUTHERS, V.C. 1976. Die paddas van die Nasionale Krugerwildtuin. Raad van Kuratore vir Nasionale Parke van Suid-Afrika, Pretoria. 91pp. 

Ptychadena
Frogs of Africa
Amphibians of Botswana
Amphibians of Eswatini
Amphibians of Kenya
Amphibians of Malawi
Amphibians of Mozambique
Amphibians of Namibia
Amphibians of South Africa
Amphibians of Tanzania
Amphibians of Zambia
Amphibians of Zimbabwe
Amphibians described in 1854
Taxa named by Wilhelm Peters
Taxonomy articles created by Polbot